The Roman Catholic Diocese of Cúcuta is a diocese located in the city of Cúcuta in the Ecclesiastical province of Nueva Pamplona in Colombia.

History
29 May 1956: Established as Diocese of Cúcuta from the Diocese of Nueva Pamplona

Ordinaries
Luis Pérez Hernández, C.I.M. † (29 May 1956 – 28 Jun 1959) Died
Pablo Correa León † (22 Jul 1959 – 27 Jul 1970) Resigned
Pedro Rubiano Sàenz (2 Jun 1971 – 26 Mar 1983) Appointed, Coadjutor Archbishop of Cali
Alberto Giraldo Jaramillo, P.S.S. (26 Jul 1983 – 18 Dec 1990) Appointed, Archbishop of Popayán
Rubén Salazar Gómez (11 Feb 1992 – 18 Mar 1999) Appointed, Archbishop of Barranquilla
Oscar Urbina Ortega (9 Nov 1999 – 30 Nov 2007) Appointed, Archbishop of Villavicencio
Jaime Prieto Amaya † (1 Dec 2008 – 25 Aug 2010) Died
Julio César Vidal Ortiz (16 Jul 2011 – 24 Jul 2015) Resigned
Víctor Manuel Ochoa Cadavid (24 Jul 2015 – 7 Dec 2020) Appointed, Bishop of Colombia, Military
José Libardo Garcés Monsalve (4 Oct 2021 – present)

See also
Roman Catholicism in Colombia

Sources

External links
 GCatholic.org

Roman Catholic dioceses in Colombia
Roman Catholic Ecclesiastical Province of Nueva Pamplona
Christian organizations established in 1956
Roman Catholic dioceses and prelatures established in the 20th century